Events from the year 1198 in Ireland.

Incumbent
Lord: John

Events

Births

Deaths
 Ruaidrí Ua Conchobair (Rory O'Connor), the last High King of Ireland, as a pilgrim in Cong (according to the Book of Leinster). He was buried in Clonmacnoise.

References